Asif Ali Khan Durrani is the current Ambassador of Pakistan to Iran since 2016. Earlier in his career, he served as ambassador to the UAE until 2016.

Background 
Durrani holds a Master's degree from the University of Balochistan in Quetta, and a Masters in International Studies and Diplomacy from the School of Oriental and African Studies, University of London. He joined the Foreign Service of Pakistan in 1986. He served in various diplomatic postings in New Delhi, Tehran, New York, Kabul and London.

References

Alumni of SOAS University of London
Ambassadors of Pakistan to the United Arab Emirates
Pashtun people
University of Balochistan alumni
Year of birth missing (living people)
Place of birth missing (living people)
Living people